Tímea Babos was the defending champion, but she chose to participate at the 2015 Grand Prix SAR La Princesse Lalla Meryem instead.

Zheng Saisai won the title, defeating Naomi Osaka in the final, 3–6, 7–5, 6–4.

Seeds

Main draw

Finals

Top half

Bottom half

References 
 Main draw

Kangaroo Cup - Singles
Kangaroo Cup
2015 in Japanese tennis